San Giovanni di Fassa (in ladin: Sèn Jan) is a comune (municipality) in Trentino in the northern Italian region Trentino-Alto Adige/Südtirol. It was formed on 1 January 2018 after the merger of the former comuni of Pozza di Fassa and Vigo di Fassa.

References

Cities and towns in Trentino-Alto Adige/Südtirol
Ladinia